Franci Petek (born 15 June 1971) is a Slovenian former ski jumper and geographer who represented Yugoslavia during his ski jumping career.

Career
At the 1991 FIS Nordic World Ski Championships in Val di Fiemme, Petek won a gold medal for Yugoslavia in the individual large hill. Petek's best finish at the Winter Olympics was 6th in the team large hill competition and 8th in the individual large hill at Albertville in 1992. He also finished 22nd in the 1990 Ski Flying World Championships and his only other victory was in an individual large hill competition at Engelberg, Switzerland in 1990.

He married Polona Kamenšek in 2000 and they have three children. Professionally he works as geographer and together with Petra Majdič he is the co-ambassador of Planica.

World Cup

Standings

Wins

References

1971 births
Living people
Slovenian male ski jumpers
Yugoslav male ski jumpers
Slovenian geographers
People from the Municipality of Kranjska Gora
Ski jumpers at the 1992 Winter Olympics
Ski jumpers at the 1994 Winter Olympics
FIS Nordic World Ski Championships medalists in ski jumping
Sportspeople from Jesenice, Jesenice
Yugoslav geographers
Universiade medalists in ski jumping
Universiade silver medalists for Slovenia
Competitors at the 1995 Winter Universiade